Kamyshanovka is a village in the Sokuluk District of Chüy Region of Kyrgyzstan located at the Kazakhstan–Kyrgyzstan border. Its population was 1,834 in 2009, and 3,196 as of January 2021. The village was established in 1912.

References

Populated places in Chüy Region